Pierre Gayraud (born 27 April 1992) is a French professional rugby union player. He plays at lock for Grenoble in the Top 14.

References

External links
Ligue Nationale De Rugby Profile
European Professional Club Rugby Profile
UBB Profile

Living people
1992 births
French rugby union players
Aviron Bayonnais players
Union Bordeaux Bègles players
Rugby union locks
Stade Toulousain players
FC Grenoble players
People from Sète
Sportspeople from Hérault